{{DISPLAYTITLE:C24H32N2O}}
The molecular formula C24H32N2O may refer to:

 APICA (synthetic cannabinoid drug) (SDB-001)
 3-Methylbutyrfentanyl (3-MBF)
 Phenaridine
 Valerylfentanyl

Molecular formulas